Ravenscourt Park is a political division of the London Borough of Hammersmith and Fulham approximately corresponding to the park and grounds of the Ravenscourt Park estate. At the 2018 local elections it returned three Councillors in a first (three) past the post system. It is represented in Hammersmith and Fulham London Borough Council by Jonathan Caleb-Landy, Bora Kwon, and  Asif Siddique all candidates of the Labour Party (UK). At the 2011 Census the population of the ward was 10,785.

References

Politics of the London Borough of Hammersmith and Fulham
R